The Unforgettable is a British television obituary-based documentary programme which aired on ITV. It gave a biographical view into the lives of some of Britain's best-remembered entertainers and actors.

Each episode focused on the parallel private and professional life-stories of each person, which included interviews with friends, family and co-stars. The series also used previously unaired home recordings and personal photographs.

Series overview

Series 1: 21 January 2000 to 7 April 2000 (6 Episodes)
Series 2: 18 September 2000 to 31 December 2000 (6 Episodes)
Series 3: 2 September 2001 to 21 May 2002 (7 Episodes)
Series 4: 8 August 2010 to 23 December 2010 (8 Episodes)
Series 5: 8 November 2011 to 30 May 2012 (11 Episodes)

Episodes
To date, five series have been produced, the first three from 2000 to 2002. Following an eight-year hiatus, the series returned in 2010.

The first two series were made by Watchmaker Productions. Series 3 was made by Chrysalis Entertainment, whilst series 4 and 5 are made by North One Television, which are all now part of All3Media.

In total, 38 episodes were produced.

The last obituary-based documentary in the series was broadcast on 30 May 2012. However, there was an additional one-off edition on 4 September 2015, focusing on The Sweeney.

Series 1 (2000)
All 6 episodes are 30 minutes long unless stated.
 Hattie Jacques (21 January 2000)
 Richard Beckinsale (15 March 2000) (45 minutes)
 Larry Grayson (19 March 2000)
 Diana Dors (24 March 2000)
 Kenny Everett (31 March 2000)
 Pat Phoenix (7 April 2000)

Series 2 (2000)
All 6 episodes are 30 minutes long.
 Arthur Lowe (18 September 2000)
 Leonard Rossiter (25 September 2000)
 Sid James (5 December 2000)
 Les Dawson (11 December 2000)
 Frankie Howerd (18 December 2000)
 Beryl Reid (31 December 2000)

Series 3 (2001-2002)
Editions are 40 minutes long unless stated.
 Tommy Cooper (2 September 2001)
 John Le Mesurier (9 September 2001)
 Kenneth Williams (23 September 2001)
 Yootha Joyce (3 October 2001) (30 mins)
 Eric Morecambe (2 November 2001) (1 hour)
 Benny Hill (14 December 2001)
 Joan Sims (21 May 2002) (30 mins)

Series 4 (2010)
Episodes 1, 2, 5, 6, 7 and 8 are one hour long unless stated.
 Bob Monkhouse (8 August 2010)
 Jeremy Beadle (15 August 2010)
 Mollie Sugden (8 September 2010) (30 minutes)
 Terry Scott (22 September 2010) (30 minutes)
 Harry Secombe (20 December 2010)
 Danny La Rue (21 December 2010)
 Mike Reid (22 December 2010)
 Spike Milligan (23 December 2010)

Series 5 (2011–2012)

All editions are 30 minutes long, unless stated.

 Norman Wisdom (8 November 2011)
 Ernie Wise (26 December 2011) (1 hour)
 John Thaw (1 January 2012) (1 hour)
 Leslie Crowther (11 January 2012)
 Rod Hull (1 February 2012)
 Russell Harty (21 March 2012)
 Dick Emery (11 April 2012)
 Hughie Green (2 May 2012)
 Noele Gordon (16 May 2012)
 Dudley Moore (23 May 2012)
 Gordon Jackson (30 May 2012)
 The Sweeney (4 September 2015) (1 hour)

References

External links
 
 

2000 British television series debuts
2012 British television series endings
ITV (TV network) original programming
Television series by All3Media
English-language television shows